The Laos–Thailand border is the international border between the territory of Laos and Thailand. The border is 1,845 km (1,146 m) in length, over half of which follows the Mekong River, and runs from the tripoint with Myanmar in the north to tripoint with Cambodia in the south.

Description
The border starts in the north at the tripoint with Myanmar at the confluence of the Kok and Mekong rivers, following the latter towards the south-east. It then leaves the river and proceeds overland in a broadly southwards direction over various hill ridges, down to the Hueang River. It then follows this river to the north-east up to the confluence with the Mekong, from where it follows the Mekong for the majority of the border's length. Just north-west of Pakse the border leaves the Mekong and then follows the ridge of the Dângrêk Mountains south the tripoint with Cambodia.

History

From the 1860s France began establishing a presence in the region, initially in modern Cambodia and Vietnam, and the colony of French Indochina was created in 1887.  The Lao kingdoms were at this point tributary states of the Kingdom of Siam (the old name for Thailand), however all areas east of the Mekong were annexed to French Indochina in 1893 following the Franco-Siamese War. In 1902 Siam was forced to cede areas west of the Mekong to France, encompassing the modern province of Sainyabuli and the western half of Champasak Province. More land was ceded in another treaty in 1904, and again in 1907. A minor treaty in 1926 cleared up the outstanding issue of sovereignty over islets in the Mekong. Following Japan’s invasion of French Indochina in 1940 the ceded areas west of the Mekong and south-western Laos were returned to Thailand, however this arrangement was annulled following Japan's defeat and the pre-war border reinstated.

Laos obtained a partial independence from France in 1949, gaining complete independence in 1953, with the boundary then becoming one between two sovereign states. Thailand occasionally made claims on the territories ceded to Laos during the colonial era, with tensions rising following the victory of the Communist Pathet Lao in the Laotian Civil War in 1975. Friendship treaties were signed in 1976 and 1979 in attempt to calm tensions, with both sides recognising the territorial integrity of the other. However fighting broke out in 1984 over disputed villages adjacent to the frontier in Sainyabuli Province/Uttaradit Province, and again in 1987–88 over a nearby area. A joint committee was established in 1991 which aimed to resolved the dispute peacefully, however discussions dragged on throughout the decade. A joint boundary commission was established in 1997, however its work was suspended in 1998 following the Asian financial crisis. As of 2018 border demarcation is still ongoing.

Border crossings
As of 2019, there were 20 permanent border crossings and 29 checkpoints for border trade.

Permanent Border Crossing

Checkpoint for Border Trade 
Border crossing open for cross-border local trade only. There are 29 checkpoints for border trade officially recognized by the Ministry of Interior, located in  provinces. Entering the opposite country beyond these checkpoints and their associated markets is illegal.

See also 
 Laos–Thailand relations

References

 
border
Borders of Thailand
Borders of Laos
International borders